The 1961 Northwestern Wildcats team represented Northwestern University during the 1961 Big Ten Conference football season. In their sixth year under head coach Ara Parseghian, the Wildcats compiled a 4–5 record (2–4 against Big Ten Conference opponents) and finished in a tie for seventh place in the Big Ten Conference.

The team's offensive leaders were Tom O'Grady with 322 passing yards, Bill Swingle with 476 rushing yards, and Willie Stinson with 158 receiving yards.

Schedule

References

Northwestern
Northwestern Wildcats football seasons
Northwestern Wildcats football